Daniel Owen Conahan Jr. (born May 11, 1954) is a convicted American murderer, rapist, and suspected serial killer. Conahan was convicted of one murder, but has been linked to a dozen murders, mostly of transients seeking employment and gay men in the Charlotte County, Florida area in what came to be known as the Hog Trail Murders.

Early life and career 

Conahan was born in Charlotte, North Carolina, and moved with his family to Punta Gorda, Florida, shortly after birth. When he was a teenager, he discovered he was homosexual; this displeased his parents, who sent him to several psychiatrists. He graduated Miami Norland High School in 1973 and joined the United States Navy in 1977, stationed at Naval Station Great Lakes in Illinois. In 1978, he was nearly court-martialed for taking fellow Naval officers off base for sex, and was discharged a few months later after getting into a fight with a man upon whom he had attempted to force oral sex.

After his Navy discharge, Conahan stayed in Chicago for 13 years before moving back to Punta Gorda to live with his elderly parents in 1993. In 1995, he became a licensed practical nurse, graduating at the top of his class from Charlotte Vocational-Technical Center. He was employed by Charlotte Regional Medical Center in Punta Gorda.

Murders 
On February 1, 1994, the mutilated corpse of a man was discovered in Punta Gorda. The body had been outside for about a month and had rope burns on the skin and the genitalia had been removed and discarded. The man was not identified until 2021, when the Charlotte County Sheriff's Office announced that new DNA testing confirmed the victim as Gerald (Jerry) Lombard, of Lowell, Massachusetts.

On January 1, 1996, a North Port family's dog brought home a male human skull. Police eventually pieced together much of a skeleton and determined that the genitalia had been cut out, similar to the 1994 victim (Lombard). The North Port skeleton has not been identified.

A third man's mutilated body was discovered in North Port on March 7, 1996. He had been killed only 10 days earlier. He also remained unidentified until June 1999, when he was identified as John William Melaragno.

Another man's skull was found in Charlotte County on April 17, 1996. Police searched the surrounding woods and found the rest of the man as well as a second body. The second was a man who had been raped, murdered, and mutilated only the day before, and was identified as Richard Allen Montgomery. The first body was later identified as Kenneth Lee Smith. Speculation became rampant about a serial killer, and the media dubbed the murders "The Hog Trail Killings", named for the wooded areas in which the bodies of the victims were found.

Arrest 

In May 1996, a few witnesses directed police to Daniel Conahan, including one who had escaped him when Conahan's car became stuck while driving him down a dirt road. Later, police linked Conahan to a 1994 Fort Myers police report where Stanley Burden had been propositioned, tied to a tree, and nearly strangled. Burden survived and had rope scars on his body two years later.

Conahan's credit cards were subpoenaed and his house was searched, turning up evidence linking him to both Burden and Montgomery.  On July 3, 1996, Conahan was arrested and brought to Lee County for the attempted murder of Burden. The following February, he was charged with the murder of Montgomery, while the attempted murder charges in the Burden case were dropped.

While Conahan awaited trial, another skeleton was found in Charlotte County on May 22, 1997. Ten months later, DNA identified the remains as William Charles Patten, who had disappeared in 1993.

Trial and imprisonment 

Conahan was tried for the 1996 kidnapping and murder of victim Richard Allen Montgomery.  In Punta Gorda, Conahan waived his right to a jury trial on August 9, 1999, thereby electing a bench trial.  The star witness was Stanley Burden, who authorities alleged had been nearly killed by Conahan in 1994. Conahan's attorney rebutted that Burden was an imprisoned pedophile, serving a 10-to-25-year sentence in Ohio. On August 17, 1999, Judge William Blackwell deliberated for 25 minutes and found Conahan guilty of first-degree premeditated murder and kidnapping.  Conahan succeeded in moving the penalty phase of his trial to Collier County but, in November, a jury recommended a sentence of death and Judge Blackwell agreed on December 10.

Conahan is currently housed at Union Correctional Institution in Raiford, Florida.

Discovery of additional skeletons 

Several more bodies were discovered in the Charlotte County area with similarities to the Hog Trail Killings: one in 2000, two in 2001, and one in 2002. On March 23, 2007, eight skulls and skeletal remains were found in a wooded area in Fort Myers, the largest such discovery in Florida history.  These came to be known as the "Fort Myers Eight".  Although a connection to a closed funeral home was considered possible, speculation soon turned to Conahan. Stanley Burden, the star witness at Conahan's trial, had been attacked within a mile of the site where the eight skeletons were found. Two were later identified as men who had disappeared in 1995. A victim who formerly known as "Victim H" was identified in September 2022 as Robert Ronald “Bobbie” Soden.

Facial reconstructions of five of the victims

In media 

The case was covered by many true crime television shows, such as: The New Detectives, Most Evil, Forensic Factor and Buried in the Backyard.

See also 

 List of death row inmates in the United States
 List of serial killers in the United States

References

External links 

 Daniel O. CONAHAN, Jr., Appellant, v. STATE of Florida, Appellee, Supreme Court of Florida, January 16, 2003

1954 births
1994 murders in the United States
1995 murders in the United States
1996 murders in the United States
20th-century American criminals
20th-century American LGBT people
21st-century American LGBT people
American kidnappers
American LGBT military personnel
American male criminals
American people convicted of kidnapping
American people convicted of murder
American prisoners sentenced to death
American rapists
American gay men
Living people
Male nurses
Miami Norland Senior High School alumni
Nurses from Florida
People convicted of murder by Florida
People from Charlotte, North Carolina
People from Chicago
People from Punta Gorda, Florida
Prisoners sentenced to death by Florida
Suspected serial killers
Torture in the United States
United States Navy sailors
Violence against gay men in the United States
Violence against men in North America